Chauncey is a census-designated place (CDP) in Logan County, West Virginia, United States. Chauncey had a post office, which opened on August 23, 1913 and closed on June 27, 2009. As of the 2010 census, its population is 283.

References

Census-designated places in Logan County, West Virginia
Census-designated places in West Virginia
Coal towns in West Virginia